Neige (meaning snow) may refer to:

People
 Neige (musician), a French singer, songwriter and musician, leader of band Alcest
 Neige Dias, a former Brazilian international tennis player

Geography
 Lac des Neiges, a waterbody in Lac-Jacques-Cartier, Quebec, Canada
 Piton des Neiges, a shield volcano on Réunion
 Rivière des Neiges, a tributary of the Montmorency River in Lac-Jacques-Cartier, Quebec, Canada

Other uses
 Grand Secretariat, the highest bureaucratic institution in the Ming and Qing dynasty government
 Neige (Black Clover), a character in the manga series Black Clover
 Neige (film), a 1981 French film